Gautam Sen is an Indian journalist, writer and automotive design consultant and expert. He is also the Vice President External Relations at Fédération Internationale de Véhicules Anciens FIVA, the international federation for historic vehicles. Sen founded India's first newsstand car magazine Indian Auto in 1986. Subsequently, he also launched Auto India in 1993, followed by the Indian editions of auto motor and sport and BBC's TopGear magazine. Directly involved with the automobile industry in India and Europe, Sen has worked with eminent designers such as Gerard Godfroy, Tom Tjaarda and Marcello Gandini. Since 2010 Sen has also published several critically acclaimed books on automobiles.

Early life and education
A graduate in economics from Presidency College, Calcutta, Sen has a Master's in Business Administration, from the XLRI, Jamshedpur.

Career

First job
Gautam Sen joined the marketing department of Maruti Udyog Limited in 1984, leaving the carmaker in 1986.

Journalism
Sen joined Business Press Pvt Ltd in 1986 to start India's first newsstand automobile magazine, The Indian Auto Journal, which was launched in September 1986.  In 1993, the Business India Group launched the magazine Auto India, with Gautam Sen as the magazine's Editor. In 1996, Gautam Sen moved to Paris, to manage the San Storm sports car project.

Sen joined Motorpresse Stuttgart in 2000, to launch the Indian edition of the German automotive magazine auto motor und sport in 2001.

Joining Worldwide Wide Media  (a BBC-Times of India joint venture), in May 2005, Sen was the founder-Editor of the Indian edition of BBC's TopGear magazine. Sen joined back the Business India Group in September 2007, to take over the running of Auto India magazine once again.

Consultancy
Sen has also consulted with several Indian and European automobile manufacturers, such as Hero Motors, TVS-Suzuki Ltd, Ideal Jawa, Hindustan Motors, DLC Automotives, San Motors and Tata Motors. Sen managed the development of India's first sports car, the San Storm.  He has also worked with several leading automobile designers: Gerard Godfroy, Tom Tjaarda and Marcello Gandini.

Other activities
Sen is a vice president with the Fédération Internationale de Véhicules Anciens (FIVA), as well as a jury member of Le Mans Classic, Chantilly Arts & Elegance,  the YanQi Island Concours d’Elegance and the Rally International du Pays de Fougères.

Honours and awards
Sen won the "Book of the Year" award in 2017 at the Festival Automobile International, in Paris, in January 2017 and Best Automotive Biography of the Year by Auto Bild Motorworld Buchpreiss for his work Marcello Gandini: Maestro of Design. In 2020, Sen, along with his co-author Daniel Cabart, won the Nicolas-Joseph Cugnot Award from the Society of Automotive Historians Book for the book Ballot.

Books
  Joyaux automobiles des Maharadjahs: a book on the automobiles acquired and retained by the erstwhile princely families of India. Published by     E.T.A.I., France, 2010. .
  The Maharajas & Their Magnificent Motor Cars: the English edition of the book on the automobiles of the erstwhile princely families of India. Published by Haynes Publishing, UK, 2011. .
  The Car Design Book: A history of automotive design, as well as on designers and some of the best automotive designs. Published by The Business India Group, 2011.
  Die Traumgaragen der Maharadschas: The German edition of the book on the automobiles of the maharajas. Published by Heel, 2012..
  Rolls-Royce 17EX A Fabulous Destiny ein Stuck Geschichte: The story of Rolls-Royce's most remarkable experimental car, in India and elsewhere, a tale of a special car, special people, of spectacular countries across continents and of over eight decades of automotive history. Published by Senthesis Eurl.
  A Million Cars for a Billion People: A perspective of the people's car movement and initiatives in India and the history of the Indian automobile industry. Published by Platinum Press.  .
  Marcello Gandini: Maestro of Design: An autography on one of the greatest automotive designer ever. . Published by Dalton Watson Fine Books. .
  The 101 Automotive Jewels of India A journey of discovery, of the most unusual, exciting and best preserved automobiles in India.. . Published by Heritage Publishers, New Delhi, India. .
  The Bertone Collection Some of the important concept cars, as well as the emblematic production models from the Bertone design studio . Published by Dalton Watson Fine Books. .
  Ballot A two volume history of one of the greatest of automotive marques ever that time has forgotten. Published by Dalton Watson Fine Books. .
Sen has also contributed to or co-authored the following books: The Story of the Star in India, The Royal Udaipur RR GLK 21, The Golden Quadrilateral and Fast Forward.

See also
 Robert Cumberford

References

External links
 www.gautamsen.com

1958 births
Living people
21st-century Indian writers
Indian expatriates in France
Indian male journalists
Presidency University, Kolkata alumni
Writers from Kolkata
XLRI – Xavier School of Management alumni
Automotive historians